L. William Caine was an American football coach. He was the first head football at Grubbs Vocational College—now known as the University of Texas at Arlington—serving for two seasons, from 1919 to 1920, and compiling a record of 2–7–1.  The school discontinued its football team after completion of the 1985 season.

References

Year of birth missing
Year of death missing
Texas–Arlington Mavericks football coaches